Liisa-Ly Pakosta (born 3 September 1969 in Tallinn) is an Estonian politician. She was a member of XII and XIII Riigikogu.

She has been a member of the party Isamaa.

2015–2022 she was a Gender Equality and Equal Treatment Commissioner.

References

1969 births
21st-century Estonian women politicians
Estonia 200 politicians
Isamaa politicians
Living people
Members of the Riigikogu, 2007–2011
Members of the Riigikogu, 2011–2015
Members of the Riigikogu, 2015–2019
Members of the Riigikogu, 2023–2027
Politicians from Tallinn
University of Tartu alumni
Women members of the Riigikogu